The Ice Cream Truck is an American psychological horror/thriller film, written and directed by Megan Elizabeth Freels Johnston, granddaughter of crime writer Elmore Leonard, and starring Deanna Russo, John Redlinger, Emil Johnsen, Hilary Barraford, Jeff Daniel Phillips and Lisa Ann Walter.

It was released on August 18, 2017. It is produced by Megan Freels Johnston, YuMee Jang and Omid Shamsoddini.

Plot
Mary (Deanna Russo) moves back to her hometown, and is quickly reminded of the quietude of suburban life. But when her neighbors start to die, she suspects that the culprit might be an odd man who drives a local ice-cream truck in this horror comedy.

Cast
 Deanna Russo as Mary
 John Redlinger as Max
 Emil Johnsen as the Ice Cream Man 
 Hilary Barraford as Jessica
 Jeff Daniel Phillips as Delivery Man
 Lisa Ann Walter as Christina
 Sam Schweikert as Nick
 Bailey Anne Borders as Tracy
 Dan Sutter as Frank
 Dana Gaier as Brie
 Declan Michael Laird as Joe
 LaTeace Towns-Cuellar as Katie
 Miles Johnston as Wil
 Mark Scheibmeir as Food Delivery Guy
 Wes O'Lee as Max's Uncle

References

External links
 
 The Ice Cream Truck - Clip
 The Ice Cream Truck - Original Trailer
 DEAR GUEST

2017 horror films
American psychological horror films
2010s English-language films
Trucker films